Franck Perera (born 21 March 1984 in Montpellier, France) is a race car driver who has competed in a number of international open-wheel racing championships.

Career
In 2006, Perera drove in the GP2 Series for the DAMS team, after four years of racing for the Prema team in junior championships. In 2007 he drove for Condor Motorsports in the Atlantic Championship, scoring three wins and finishing second in the championship behind Raphael Matos. On 6 February 2008 Perera announced that he had signed with Conquest Racing to compete in the Champ Car World Series in 2008 after a successful test with the team. However, shortly thereafter Champ Car and the Indy Racing League unified, canceling the Champ Car season. It was announced on 25 February that Perera had modified his deal in order to continue with the team in the IRL IndyCar Series. He lost the ride after three races due to funding issues stemming from the bankruptcy of his sponsor Opes Prime, causing the team to hire Brazilian driver Jaime Camara.

In order to continue racing in the US, Perera signed to drive in Firestone Indy Lights with Guthrie Racing for the remainder of the 2008 season and made his debut in the seventh race of the season at the Iowa Speedway. He captured his first series victory from the pole at Infineon Raceway, his eighth start. He returned to the IndyCar Series for the points-scoring finale at Chicagoland Speedway, driving the #41 car of A. J. Foyt Enterprises. He was also signed to drive the car of A.S. Roma in the brand new Superleague Formula championship in 2008.

Perera returned to the GP2 Series in 2009, replacing Giacomo Ricci at David Price Racing. Perera was not allowed to start the feature race of the Hungarian round, due to causing an avoidable accident in qualifying, with Romain Grosjean. As his lap time was outside 107% of Lucas di Grassi's pole time, the stewards refused to let him race due to the accident. Grosjean however, was allowed to start. Perera also failed to qualify for both races of the championship held at the Spa-Francorchamps circuit. He left the GP2 Series for the second time after the Spa round. Perera returned to A.S. Roma in the Superleague Formula in 2009 for the Estoril round taking over from Jonathan Kennard. He was replaced at the next round by Julien Jousse.

In 2013, Perera returned full-time, driving a Porsche 911 in the Blancpain Endurance Series for Pro GT by Almeras in the Pro-Am class.

Racing record

Career summary

† Guest driver, ineligible for points

‡ Team standings
 * Season still in progress.

Complete Formula Renault 3.5 Series results
(key) (Races in bold indicate pole position) (Races in italics indicate fastest lap)

Complete GP2 Series results
(key) (Races in bold indicate pole position) (Races in italics indicate fastest lap)

American open–wheel racing results
(key) (Races in bold indicate pole position)

Atlantic Championship

IndyCar Series

 1 Run on same day.

Superleague Formula
(key) (Races in bold indicate pole position) (Races in italics indicate fastest lap)

2009 Super Final Results
Super Final results in 2009 did not count for points towards the main championship.

Complete Blancpain GT Series Sprint Cup results

24 Hours of Daytona results

Complete WeatherTech SportsCar Championship results
(key) (Races in bold indicate pole position; results in italics indicate fastest lap)

Complete Deutsche Tourenwagen Masters results 
(key) (Races in bold indicate pole position) (Races in italics indicate fastest lap)

References

External links
 
 

1984 births
Living people
Sportspeople from Montpellier
French people of Spanish descent
French racing drivers
Italian Formula Renault 2.0 drivers
German Formula Renault 2.0 drivers
Dutch Formula Renault 2.0 drivers
Formula Renault Eurocup drivers
GP2 Series drivers
Formula 3 Euro Series drivers
Atlantic Championship drivers
Indy Lights drivers
IndyCar Series drivers
Superleague Formula drivers
World Series Formula V8 3.5 drivers
Blancpain Endurance Series drivers
International GT Open drivers
European Le Mans Series drivers
24 Hours of Spa drivers
24 Hours of Daytona drivers
WeatherTech SportsCar Championship drivers
24H Series drivers
British GT Championship drivers
Prema Powerteam drivers
DAMS drivers
Deutsche Tourenwagen Masters drivers
ADAC GT Masters drivers
Conquest Racing drivers
TDS Racing drivers
ISR Racing drivers
Emil Frey Racing drivers
A. J. Foyt Enterprises drivers
Karting World Championship drivers
Mercedes-AMG Motorsport drivers
Alan Docking Racing drivers
Target Racing drivers
David Price Racing drivers
Scuderia Coloni drivers
Nürburgring 24 Hours drivers
Lamborghini Squadra Corse drivers
Iron Lynx drivers
Euronova Racing drivers